The Prix Bordin is a series of prizes awarded annually by each of the five institutions making up the Institut Français since 1835.

History
The prize was created by Charles-Laurent Bordin, a notary in Paris from 1794 to 1820, who bequeathed 12,000 Francs to the Institut de France in his testament dated April 7, 1835, for the foundation of an annual prize to be given to each of the five:
 the Académie Française, in order to "encourage high literature"; the prize was given irregularly until 1988 
 the Académie des inscriptions et belles-lettres
 the French Academy of Sciences. The awarding of the prize is linked with a contest organized by the Academy. 
 the Académie des Sciences morales et politiques : the biennial prize is awarded to "works treating upon subjects relating to the public interest, to the wellbeing of humanity, to the progress of science and to national honor (of France)."
 the Académie des Beaux-Arts: to reward works on painting, sculpture, architecture, engraving or music.

Laureates of the Académie Française

From 1857 to 1899
 1857: Eugène Rosseeuw Saint-Hilaire for Histoire d'Espagne
 1859: Nicolas Eugène Géruzez for Histoire de la littérature française depuis ses origines jusqu'à la Révolution et pendant la Révolution
 1860: Louis Ratisbonne for Translation in verse of Dante
 1861: André Sayous for Histoire de la littérature française à l'étranger pendant le XVIIIe siècle
 1862: 
 Léon Halévy for his translation into verse of Greek tragedies
 Auguste Lacaussade for Poèmes et Paysages
 1863: Ferdinand Béchard for Droit municipal dans l'antiquité et Droit municipal au moyen âge
 1865: 
 Jules Bonnet for Récits du XVIe siècle, Aonio Paleario, étude sur la Réforme en Italie and Olympia Morata
 Eugène Fallex for his translation into verse of Aristophanes
 Édélestand Pontas du Méril for Histoire de la comédie
 Eugène Rosseeuw Saint-Hilaire for Histoire d'Espagne
 1866: Alphonse Dantier for Les monastères bénédictins d'Italie
 1867: Elme-Marie Caro for La philosophie de Gœthe
 1868: Emmanuel Henri Victurnien de Noailles for Henri de Valois and la Pologne en 1572
 1869: Alexis Chassang for Le Spiritualisme et l’Idéal dans la poésie des Grecs
 1870: 
 Guillaume-Alfred Heinrich for Histoire de la littérature allemande
 Constant Martha for Poème de Lucrèce
 1871: Alfred Fouillée for La philosophie de Platon
 1872: Jules Gauthier for Histoire de Marie Stuart
 1873: Georges Perrot for L’éloquence politique et judiciaire à Athènes
 1874: 
 Adolphe Bossert for La littérature allemande au moyen âge et les origines de l’épopée germanique, Goethe, ses précurseurs et ses contemporains and Goethe et Schiller
 Jules Sauzay for Histoire de la persécution révolutionnaire dans le département du Doubs de 1789 à 1801
 1875: Gustave Desnoiresterres for Voltaire et la société française au XVIIIe siècle
 1876: 
 Ernest Daudet for Histoire du ministère de M. de Martignac, sa vie politique et les dernières années de la Restauration
 Jules Levallois for Corneille inconnu
 1877: François-Régie Chantelauze for Marie Stuart, son procès et son exécution
 1878: 
 Arthur Gobineau for La Renaissance
 Gustave Merlet for Tableau de la littérature française de 1800-1815
 1879: 
 Ernest Lichtenberger for Étude sur les poésies lyriques de Goethe
 Charles Schmidt for Histoire littéraire de l’Alsace
 1880: Henri Baudrillart for Histoire du luxe privé et public depuis l’antiquité jusqu’à nos jours
 1881: 
 (the widow of) Paul Albert
 Émile Gebhart for Les origines de la Renaissance
 Julian Klaczko for Causeries florentines
 1882: 
 Georges Pallain for Correspondance inédite du prince de Talleyrand et du roi Louis XVIII pendant le Congrès de Vienne
 Albert Vandal for Louis XV et Élisabeth de Russie
 1883: Ferdinand Brunetière for Le roman naturaliste and Études critiques sur l’histoire de la littérature française
 1884:
 James Darmesteter Essais orientaux
 Georges Duruy Le cardinal Carlo Carafa
 1885: 
 Prince Emmanuel de Broglie for Fénelon à Cambrai, d’après sa correspondance (1699-1715)
 François Laouënan for Le brahmanisme et ses rapports avec le judaïsme, le judaïsme et le christianisme
 1886: 
 Charles Bénard La philosophie ancienne
 Charles de Baillon Henriette-Anne d’Angleterre, duchesse d’Orléans
 Gustave-Armand-Henri de Reiset for Modes et usages au temps de Marie-Antoinette
 1887:
 Émile Bérard-Varagnac for Portraits littéraires
 Jacques Denis for La Comédie grecque
 1888:
 Prince Georges Bibesco for Au Mexique, 1862. Combats et retraite des Six Mille
 Stéphen Liégeard La côte d’Azur
 René Millet La France provinciale
 1889: Charles Ravaisson-Mollien Les manuscrits de Léonard de Vinci
 1890:
 Antonin Fabre for Chapelain et nos deux premières Académies
 Alfred Marchand for Les poètes lyriques de l’Autriche
 Maurice Paléologue for Vauvenargues
 Gabriel Sarrazin for La Renaissance de la poésie anglaise (1798-1889) and les poètes modernes de l’Angleterre
 Émile Simond for Histoire du 28e régiment de ligne
 1891: 
 Georges Bengesco for Voltaire
 Auguste Couat Aristophane et l’ancienne comédie attique
 Théodore Reinach Mithridate Eupator, roi de Pont
 1892:
 Charles Ravaisson-Mollien Les manuscrits de Léonard de Vinci
 Eugène Titeux for Histoire de la Maison militaire du Roy, de 1814 à 1830
 1893: 
 Viscountess Bardonnet for Mémoires et souvenirs du baron Hyde de Neuville
 Charles Dardier for Paul Rabaut, ses lettres à Antoine Court (1739-1755) and Paul Rabaut, ses lettres à divers (1744-1794)
 Charles de Moüy L’ambassade du duc de Créqui (1662-1665)
 Charles Lenthéric for Le Rhône, histoire d’un fleuve
 1894:
 Victor Cucheval for Histoire de l’éloquence romaine depuis la mort de Cicéron jusqu’à l’avènement de l’empereur Hadrien
 Antoine Guillois for Le salon de Madame Helvétius. Cabanis et les idéologues
 Hippolyte Parigot for Le théâtre d’hier
 Auguste Rey for Les cahiers de Saint-Prix
 Léopold Sudre for Les sources du roman de Renart
 1895: 
 Clément de La Jonquière for L’armée à l’Académie
 Théophile Funck-Brentano for L’homme et sa destinée
 Jean-Jules Jusserand for Histoire littéraire du peuple anglais, des origines à la Renaissance
 Théodore Gosselin for Paris révolutionnaire
 1896:
 Ferdinand Belin for Histoire de l’ancienne université de Provence : Aix
 Robert de la Sizeranne for La peinture anglaise contemporaine
 1897:
 Henry Bordeaux for La Vie et l’Art
 Francis de Pressensé for Le Cardinal Manning
 Eugène Ritter for La famille et la jeunesse de Rousseau
 1898:
 Maurice de Fleury for Introduction à la médecine de l’esprit
 Henri Druon for Histoire de l’éducation des princes dans la Maison des Bourbons de France
 Georges Goyau for L’Allemagne religieuse : le Protestantisme
 1899:
 Henry Lapauze for Les pastels de De La Tour à Saint-Quentin
 Constantin Lecigne for Brizeux, sa vie et ses œuvres

From 1900 to 1939
 1900:
 Count Théodore Paul Émile Ducos for La mère du duc d’Enghien (1750-1822)
 Émile Dupré-Lasale for Michel de l’Hospital (1555-1960)
 Henri Lichtenberger for Richard Wagner, poète et penseur
 Louis Maigron for Le Roman historique à l'époque romantique
 Jean-Baptiste Mispoulet for La vie parlementaire à Rome sous la République
 1901: 
 Henry Fouquier for Philosophie parisienne
 Victor Giraud for Essais sur Taine, son œuvre et son influence
 Georges Le Bidois for La vie dans la tragédie de Racine
 1902:
 André Bellessort La société japonaise
 André le Breton for Le roman français au XIXe siècle avant Balzac
 Édouard Ruel for Du sentiment artistique dans la morale de Montaigne
 1903:
 Paul Allard for Julien l’Apostat
 Ignác Kont for Étude sur l’influence de la littérature française en Hongrie (1772-1896)
 Adolphe Liéby for Étude sur le théâtre de Marie Joseph Chénier
 Francisque Vial for L’enseignement secondaire et la démocratie
 1904:
 Victor de Swarte for Descartes directeur spirituel
 Paul Gautier for Madame de Staël et Napoléon
 Paul et Victor Glachant for Essai critique sur le théâtre de Victor Hugo
 Gustave Michaut for Sainte-Beuve avant les lundis
 1905:
 Charles ab der Halden for Études de littérature canadienne française
 Adolphe Bossert for Schopenhauer
 René Canat for Du sentiment de la solitude morale chez les romantiques et les parnassiens
 Émile Dard for Le général Choderlos de Laclos (1741-1803)
 Paul Decharme for La critique des traditions religieuses chez les Grecs, des origines au temps de Plutarque
 1906:
 Alfred Barbeau for Une ville d’eaux anglaise au XVIIIe siècle
 Philippe Godet for Madame de Charrière et ses amis (1740-1805)
 Édouard Herriot for Madame Récamier et ses amis
 Samuel Rocheblave for George Sand et sa fille d’après leur correspondance inédite
 1907:
 Jean Baruzi for Leibniz et l’organisation religieuse de la terre
 Marc Citoleux for La poésie philosophique au XIXe siècle : Lamartine. Mme Ackermann
 Camille Latteille for Joseph de Maistre et la Papauté
 Julien Luchaire for Essai sur l'évolution intellectuelle de l'Italie, de 1815 à 1830
 1908:
 Albert Cassagne for La théorie de l’art pour l’art
 Angelo De Gubernatis for La poésie amoureuse de la Renaissance italienne
 Louis Delaruelle for Guillaume Budé
 Guillaume Hüszar for Molière et l’Espagne
 Clodius Piat for Les philosophes grecs : Socrate, Aristote, Platon
 1909:
 Jules Charrier for Claude Fauchet, évêque constitutionnel du Calvados (1744-1793)
 Georges Dalmeyda for Goethe et le drame antique
 René Radouant for Guillaume du Vair (1556-1596)
 1910: 
 Joseph Dedieu for Montesquieu et la tradition politique anglaise en France
 Charles Drouhet for Le poète François Mainard (1583-1646)
 Gabriel Maugain for Étude sur l’évolution intellectuelle de l’Italie de 1657 à 1750 environ
 François Vézinet for Molière, Florian et la littérature espagnole
 1911:
 Victor Giraud for Blaise Pascal. L’homme, l’œuvre, l’influence
 Paul Hazard for La Révolution française et les lettres italiennes
 Philippe Millet for La crise anglaise
 Napoléon-Maurice Bernardin for L’abbé Frifillis
 Alfred Jeanroy for Giosué Carducci, l’homme et le poète
 Hippolyte Loiseau for L’évolution morale de Goethe. Les années de libre formation (1749-1794)
 Émile Magne for Voiture et les origines de l’hôtel de Rambouillet (1597-1635)
 Auguste Rochette for L’Alexandrin chez Victor Hugo
 1913:
 Louis-Frédéric Choisy for Alfred Tennyson, son spiritualisme, sa personnalité morale
 Joseph Drouet for L’abbé de Saint-Pierre, l’homme et l’œuvre
 Jean Lucas-Dubreton for La disgrâce de Nicolas Machiavel. Florence (1469-1527)
 Charles Régismanset for Le bienfaiteur de la ville
 1914:
 Joseph-Émile Dresch for Le roman social en Allemagne (1850-1900)
 Christian Maréchal for La famille de La Mennais sous l’ancien Régime et la Révolution
 Jean Nesmy for Le roman de la forêt
 Henry Prunières for L’opéra italien en France avant Lulli
 1916:
 Mr. Alline
 Ernest-Amédée de Renty
 François Gébelin
 Marcel Godet for La Congrégation de Montaigu
 Amédée Guiard
 Joachim Merlant
 Paul Peyre for Du droit et du devoir de l’éducation
 André Ruplinger for Charles Bordes, membre de l'Académie de Lyon (1711-1781)
 1917:
 Louis Cario for Annette, un été au pays basque
 Marcel Dupont for En campagne
 Pompiliu Eliade for La Roumanie au XIXe siècle
 René La Bruyère for Deux années de guerre navale
 Léon Lahovary for Les Lauriers et les Glaives
 1918:
 Édouard Guyot for L’Angleterre (sa politique intérieure)
 Albert Monod for De Pascal à Châteaubriand
 Léon Rosenthal for Du romantisme au réalisme
 Paul Van Tieghem for Ossian en France
 1919:
 Albert Chérel for Fénelon au XVIIIe siècle en France
 Émile Ripert for La Renaissance provençale (1800-1860)
 1920:
 Albert Autin for La maison en deuil
 A. Dutil for Les chars d’assaut
 Casimir-Alexandre Fusil for La poésie scientifique de 1750 à nos jours
 Édouard Guyot for H.-G. Wells
 Raymonde Machard for Tu enfanteras
 Jean Suberville for Le théâtre d’Edmond Rostand
 Bénjamin Vallotton for Ceux de Barivier
 1921:
 Louis-Frédéric Choisy for Sainte-Beuve, l’homme et le poète
 Pierre de Labriolle for Histoire de la littérature latine chrétienne
 Léon Deffoux and Émile Zavie for Le groupe de Médan
 Ernest Delahaye for Verlaine
 L. Letellier for Louis Bouilhet, sa vie, ses œuvres
 Henri Morice for La poésie de Sully-Prud’homme
 1922:
 Clara de Longworth-Chambrun Giovanni Florio
 Henri Girard Un bourgeois dilettante à l’époque contemporaine, Émile Deschamps
 Gonzague Truc Tibériade
 Philippe Van Tieghem La poésie de la nuit et des tombeaux en Europe au XVIIIe siècle
 Maurice Vaussard L’intelligence catholique dans l’Italie au XXe siècle
 1923:
 Jacques Arnavon La représentation de la Comédie classique. Notes sur l’interprétation de Molière
 Alexandre Masseron Les énigmes de la Divine Comédie
 Joseph Segond L'Imagination
 Édouard Thamiry De l’influence et La méthode d’influence de Saint-François-de-Sales
 1924:
 Émile Dermenghem Joseph de Maistre mystique
 René Galland Georges Meredith (1828-1878)
 Jean Larat La tradition et l’exotisme dans l’œuvre de Charles Nodier
 Maurice Legendre Portrait de l’Espagne
 Charles Loiseau Politique romaine et sentiment français
 Frederick Charles Roe Taine et l’Angleterre
 1925:
 Adolphe Coster Luis de Léon
 Maurice de Fleury L’Angoisse humaine
 Camille Looten for Shakespeare et la religion
 Arthur Lytton Sells for Les sources françaises de Goldsmith
 Paul Truffau for Raoul de Cambrai
 1926:
 Ernest de Ganay for Chantilly au XVIIIe siècle
 Cornelis Kramer for André Chénier et la poésie parnassienne
 Maurice Levaillant for Splendeurs et misères de M. de Chateaubriand
 Émile Pons for Swift, les années de jeunesse and le conte du tonneau"
 Albert Valentin for Giovanni Pascoli, poète lyrique 1927:
 Geneviève Bianquis for La poésie autrichienne de Hofmannsthal à Rilke Georges Connes for Étude sur la pensée de H. G. Wells Clara de Longworth-Chambrun for Shakespeare, auteur, poète A. Augustin-Thierry for La princesse Beljiojoso 1928:
 Paul Berret for Victor Hugo Robert Chantemesse for Le roman inconnu de la duchesse d’Abrantès John Charpentier for Coleridge Maurice Magendie for Du nouveau sur l’Astrée Pierre Moreau for Chateaubriand, l’homme et la vie, le génie et les livres Marcel Raymond for L’influence de Ronsard sur la poésie française 1929:
 Fernand Desonay for Le rêve hellénique chez les poètes parnassiens Robert d'Harcourt for La jeunesse de Schiller Lucien Maury for L’imagination scandinave James Sirven for Les années d’apprentissage de Descartes 1930:
 Jules Chaix-Ruy for De Renan à Jacques Rivière René Grousset for Sur les traces de Bouddha Jules Legras for La littérature en Russie 1931:
 Marguerite Aron for Un animateur de la jeunesse au XIIIe siècle. Bx Jourdain de Saxe Charles Felgères for Scènes et tableaux de l’histoire d’Auvergne Émilie Romieu for La Vie de George Eliot et La Vie des sœurs Brontë 1932:
 Maurice Bardon for Don Quichotte en France au XVIIe et au XVIIIe siècle Claire-Éliane Engel for La littérature alpestre Pierre Lyautey for L’Empire colonial français Jacques Meniaud for Les pionniers du Soudan 1933:
 Henri Ghéon for Promenades avec Mozart Agnès de La Gorce for Francis Thomson et les poètes catholiques d’Angleterre Régis Jolivet for Saint Augustin et le néoplatonisme Raymond Las Vergnas for W.-M. Thackeray Maurice Magendie for Le roman français au XVIIe siècle Henriette Psichari for Ernest Psichari, mon frère 1934:
 Paul Dudon for Saint Ignace de Loyola Jean Guitton for La philosophie de Newman Pierre Humbert for Un amateur : Peiresc Jean Lescoffier for Bjorson 1935:
 R.P. François Charmot for L'Humanisme et l'Humain André Fauconnet for Études sur l'Allemagne Modeste Lioudvigovitch Hofmann and André Pierre for La vie de Tolstoï Louis Jalabert for Syrie et Liban René Lote for Histoire de la culture allemande Pierre Séchaud for Victor de Laprade, l'homme, son œuvre poétique 1936:
 Alexis Carrel for L'homme, cet inconnu Robert d'Harcourt for Goethe et l’art de vivre Paul Henry, S.J. for Plotin et l'Occident Isabelle Rivière for Le bouquet de roses rouges Véga for Henri Heine peint, par lui-même et par les autres 1937:
 Jacques Arnavon for L’École des femmes, de Molière Jacques de Broglie for Madame de Staël et sa cour au château de Chaumont Léon-Basile Guerdan for Un ami oriental de Barrès, Tigrane Yergate Robert Mattlé for Lamartine voyageur Joannes Van der Lugt for L'action religieuse, de Ferdinand Brunetière 1938:
 Jean Cathala for Portrait de l'Estonie Yves Congar for Chrétiens désunis René Dollot for L'Afghanistan Lucienne Portier for Antonio Fogazzaro Auguste Thomazi for Les flottes de l'or Henri de Ziégler for Vie de l'Empereur Frédéric II de Hohenstaufen 1939:
 Raymond Christoflour for Louis le Cardonel Jean Wahl for Études KierkegardiennesFrom 1940 to 1988
 1940:
 Marie Delcourt for Périclès Alexandre Masseron for Pour comprendre la Divine Comédie Anatole Rivoallan for Littérature irlandaise contemporaine 1941:
 Albert Dauzat for Tableau de la langue française 1942: 
 Pierre-Henri Simon
 1943:
 Philippe Bertault for Balzac et la Religion 1944:
 Joseph Desaymard for L'Auvergne dans les lettres contemporaines 1945:
 Eugène David-Bernard for La conquête de Madagascar 1946:
 Floris Delattre for La personnalité d’Auguste Angelier Edmond Delucinge for Images littéraires de Savoie Henri Morier for Le rythme du vers libre symboliste Auguste Viatte for Victor Hugo et les illuminés de son temps 1947: Victor-Henry Debidour for Saveur des lettres 1948:
 Clara de Longworth-Chambrun for Shakespeare retrouvé Albert Lopez for Un poète et sa divine Charles Mauron for L'homme triple Ludovic O'Followell for La vie manquée de Félix Arvers Maurice Ricord for Louis Bertrand l'Africain André Trofimoff for Au jardin des mused françaises 1949: John Charpentier for Alexandre Dumas 1950:
 Raphaël Barquissau for Les poètes créoles du XVIIIe siècle Claire-Éliane Engel for Esquisses anglaises 1951:
 Louis Chaigne for Vies et œuvres d'écrivains André-Jean Festugière for L'enfant d'Agrigente, suivi de Le grec et la nature 1952:
 Jacques-Henry Bornecque for Les années d’apprentissage d'Alphonse Daudet Pierre Sage for Le "bon prêtre" dans la littérature française 1953: Jean Soulairol for Paul Valéry 1955: Louis-Édouard Tabary for Duranty 1956: Auguste Haury for L’Ironie et l’Humour chez Cicéron 1957: 
 Yves Le Hir for Esthétique et structure du vers français Yves du Parc for Dans le sillage de Stendhal 1958: Georges Cattaui for T. S. Eliot 1959: René Jasinski for Vers le vrai Racine 1960:
 Victor Del Litto for La vie intellectuelle de Stendhal Renée Lelièvre for Le Théâtre dramatique italien en France 1855-1940 1961:
 Aimée Alexandre for Le Mythe de Tolstoï André Lagarde and Laurent Michard for Les grands auteurs français 1962: Simone Blavier-Paquot for La Fontaine, vues sur l’art du moraliste 1963: Armand Pierhal for l'ensemble de son œuvre 1964: Jean-Georges Ritz for Le poète Gérard Manley Hopkins 1844-1889 1965: Jean Mesnard for l'Édition des Œuvres complètes de Pascal 1966: 
 David Albert Griffiths for Jean Reynaud, encyclopédiste de l’Époque romantique Pierre Menanteau for Images d’André Mage de Fiefmelin, poète baroque 1967: Jean Onimus for La Connaissance poétique 1968: Edmée de La Rochefoucauld for En lisant les cahiers de Paul Valéry 1969: Henry Bonnier for l'Édition des Œuvres complètes de Vauvenargues 1970: Dominique Janicaud for Une généalogie du spiritualisme français 1971: Philippe Sellier for Pascal et saint Augustin 1972: Elie Wiesel for Célébration hassidique 1973: Pierre Marchais for Glossaire de Psychiatrie1974: François Châtelet for L’Histoire de la philosophie 1975:
 Guillaume Guindey for Le drame de la pensée dialectique, Hegel, Marx, Sartre Marie-Dominique Philippe for L’Être. Recherche d’une philosophie première 1976: René Démoris for Le roman à la première personne 1977: Mircea Elide for Histoire des croyances et des idées religieuses de l’âge de pierre aux mystères d’Eleusis 1978: 
 Paul Bénichou for Le temps des prophètes. Doctrine de l’âge romantique Jean Lafond for La Rochefoucauld. Augustinisme et littératureLaureates of the Académie des Inscriptions et Belles-Lettres
Orientalism
 1861: Hermann Zotenberg
 1904:
 William Marçais for Le Taqrîb de En-Nawawi, Le dialecte arabe parlé à Tlemcen et Les monuments arabes de Tlemcen. Charles Fossey for Manuel d'Assyriologie Antoine Cabaton for Nouvelles Recherches sur les Chams. 1907:
 Edmond Doutté for Merrâkech Adamantios Adamantiou for Chronique de Morée Armand Guérinot for Bibliographie du Jaïnisme Gaston Migeon for Manuel d'art musulman Jean Touzard for Grammaire hébraïque Henry de Castries for Sources inédites de l'histoire du Maroc 1910:
 Hermine Harrleben for Correspondance de Champollion Félix Lacôte for Essai sur Gunāḍhya et la "Bṛhatkathā" François Martin for Lettres néo-babyloniennes Antoine Cabaton for Catalogue sommaire des manuscrits sanscrits et pālis de la Bibliothèque nationale Mr. Delaporte for La Chronographie syriaque d'Élie bâr Sinaya (Chronographia of Elijah of Nisibis)
 1913:
 Étienne Lunet de Lajonquière for Inventaire descriptif des monuments du Cambodge Antoine Cabaton for Catalogue sommaire des manuscrits indiens, indo-chinois et malayopolynésiens de la Bibliothèque nationale Léon Legrain for Le temps des rois d'Ur Emmanuel Podechard for L'Ecclésiaste Fulcran Vigouroux for Dictionnaire de la Bible 1916:
 Edmond Fagnan for Mawerdi (Abou'l-Hasan ʿAli). Les Statuts gouvernementaux, ou Règles de droit public et administratif François Nau for Les ménologes des évangéliaires coptes-arabes and Ammonas, successeur de saint Antoine. 1937:
 Jean-Philippe Lauer for Fouilles à Saqqarah G. Ort-Geuthner for Grammaire démotique du Papyrus magique de Londres et de Leyde 1940:
 Roman Ghirshman for Fouilles de Sialk, près de Kashan Armand Ruhlmann for Les Grottes préhistoriques d'"El Khenzira" (région de Mazagan) and Les Recherches de préhistoire dans l'extrême Sud marocain 1943:
 Jean Sauvaget for Alep : essai sur le développement d'une grande ville syrienne des origines au milieu du XIXe siècle Abbé Chaîne for Notions de langue égyptienne. Langue du Nouvel-Empire Robert-C. Flavigny for Le Dessin de l'Asie occidentale ancienne 1946:
 Jean Vercoutter for Les objets égyptiens et égyptisants du mobilier funéraire carthaginois Robert de Langhe for Les textes de Ras Shamra-Ugarit et leurs rapports avec le milieu biblique de l'Ancien Testament 1949:
 Marcel Simon for Verus Israël, les relations entre juifs et chrétiens dans l'empire romain (135-425) Jean David-Weill for Le Djami, d'Ibn Wahb 1952:
 Pierre Merlat for Répertoire des inscriptions et monuments figurés du culte de Jupiter Dolichenus René Neuville for Le paléolithique et le mésolithique du désert de Judée 1958: René Brunel for Le Monachisme errant dans l'Islam, Sīdi Heddi et les Heddāwa 1961: Yvonne Rosengarten for Le Régime des offrandes dans la société sumérienne et Le concept sumérien de consommation dans la vie économique et religieuse 1964: René Labat for Manuel d’épigraphie akkadienne : signes, syllabaires, idéogrammes 1967 Toudic Fahd for La Divination arabe, études religieuses, sociologiques et folkloriques sur le milieu natif de l'Islam 1970: Maurice Birot for Tablettes économiques et administratives d'époque babylonienne ancienne 1973: Jean-Claude Goyon for Confirmation du pouvoir royal au nouvel an 1976: André Raymond for Artisans et commerçants au Caire au XVIIIe siècle 1979: Arion Roșu for Les conceptions psychologiques dans les textes médicaux indiens 1982: Centre de documentation et de recherche sur la civilisation khmère
 1985: Francesca Bray for Science and civilisation in China (Volume 6) 1991: Nathalie Beaux for  Le cabinet de curiosités de Thoutmosis III. Plantes et animaux du « Jardin botanique » de Karnak 1994: Joseph Mélèze-Modrzejewski for all of his work
 1997: Audran Labrousse for L’architecture des pyramides à textes. I, Saqqara Nord 2000: Adnan Bounni, Jacques Lagarce and Élisabeth Lagarce for Ras Ibn Hani. I, Le palais nord du Bronze récent. Fouilles 1979-1995, synthèse préliminaire 2003: Bruno Dagens and Marie-Luce Barazer-Billoret for traduction du Rauravâgama : un traité de rituel et de doctrine shivaïtes 2006: Louis Le Quellec for Du Sahara au Nil. Peintures et gravures d’avant les pharaons 2009: Florence Jullien for Le monachisme en Perse. La réforme d’Abraham le Grand, père des moines de l’Orient 2010: Abdelhamid Fenina for Numismatique et histoire de la monnaie en Tunisie 2012: Aram Mardirossian for La collection canonique d’Antioche. Droit et hérésie à travers le premier recueil de législation ecclésiastique (IVe s.) 2015: Philippe Vallat for Épître sur l’intellect d’Abū Nasr al-Fārābī 2019: Anna Caiozzo for Le Roi glorieux. Les imaginaires de la royauté d’après les enluminures du Shāh Nāma de Firdawsī aux époques timouride et turkmène 2021: Géraud Poumarède for L’Empire de Venise et les Turcs, XVIe-XVIIe sièclesClassical Antiquity
 1901: Alfred Foucher for his mémoire entitled Une page nouvelle dans l'histoire de l'art grec (E. Curtius) 1903:
 Charles Lécrivain for his mémoire entitled In labore solatium Léon Homo for his mémoire entitled Quid de Historia Augusta sentiendum Mr. Colin for his mémoire entitled Furor est, si alienigenae homines, plus lingua et moribus et legibus quam maris terrarumque spatio discreti, etc., etc.. 1905:
 Gustave Glotz for La solidarité de la famille dans le droit criminel en Grèce Auguste Audollent for Carthage romaine 1908:
 Gustave Lefebvre for Fragments d’un manuscrit de Ménandre  for Les clausules métriques latines Victor Chapot for La Frontière de l'Euphrate, de Pompée à la conquête arabe  for La Table latine d'Héraclée Léon Robin for La Théorie platonicienne des idées et des nombres d'après Aristote 1911:
 Philippe-Ernest Legrand for Daos, tableau de la Comédie grecque pendant la période dite nouvelle Camille Sourdille for Hérodote et la religion de l'Égypte et La Durée et l'étendue du voyage d'Hérodote en Égypte Charles Plésent for Le culex, étude sur l'alexandrinisme latin Alfred Besançon for Les Adversaires de l'hellénisme à Rome pendant la période républicaine 1914:
 Eugène de Faye for Gnostiques et gnosticisme Waldemar Deonna for L'Archéologie Jean Lesquier for Les Institutions militaires de l'Égypte Raymond Billiard for La vigne dans l'Antiquité 1917:
 Jean Maspero for Papyrus grecs d'époque byzantine Pierre Gusman for L’Art décoratif de Rome de la fin de la République au IVe siècle 1923:
 Robert Fawtier for Sainte Catherine de Sienne Armand Delatte for Essai sur la politique pythagoricienne Jules Marouzeau for L'ordre des mots dans la phrase latine 1911:
 Philippe-Ernest Legrand for Daos, tableau de la Comédie grecque pendant la période dite nouvelle Camille Sourdille for Hérodote et la religion de l'Égypte et La Durée et l'étendue du voyage d'Hérodote en Égypte Charles Plésent for Le culex, étude sur l'alexandrinisme latin Alfred Besançon for Les Adversaires de l'hellénisme à Rome pendant la période républicaine 1914:
 Eugène de Faye for Gnostiques et gnosticisme Waldemar Deonna for L'Archéologie Jean Lesquier for Les Institutions militaires de l'Égypte Raymond Billiard for La vigne dans l'Antiquité 1917:
 Jean Maspero for Papyrus grecs d'époque byzantine Pierre Gusman for L’Art décoratif de Rome de la fin de la République au IVe siècle 1923:
 Robert Fawtier for Sainte Catherine de Sienne Armand Delatte for Essai sur la politique pythagoricienne Jules Marouzeau for L'ordre des mots dans la phrase latine 1938:
 André-Jean Festugière  for Contemplation et vie contemplative selon Platon Paul Cloché  for Démosthènes et la fin de la démocratie athénienne1941:
 Marcel Durry  for  his edition of Panégyrique de Trajan Mr. Cordier  for his studies on the epic vocabulary of the Æneid
 Marius Soffray  for his research into the syntax of saint John Chrysostome according to the Homélies sur les statues 1944:
 André Loyen  for  Sidoine Apollinaire et l'esprit précieux en Gaule aux derniers jours de l'Empire André Magdelaine  for Essai sur les origines de la sponsio 1947:
 William Seston  for  Dioclétien et la tétrarchie Jacqueline Duchemin  for L'Agôn dans la tragédie grecque Robert Marichal  for L'Occupation romaine de la Basse-Egypte, le statut des "auxilia" Émile Szlechter  for Le contrat de société en Babylonie, en Grèce et à Rome 1959:
 Pierre Fabre  for Saint Paulin de Nole et l'amitié chrétienne Dr. R. Pépin  for  "Liber medicinalis" de Quintus Serenus (Serenus Sammonicus) 1953:
 Paul Cloché  for  Thèbes de Béotie, des origines à la conquête romaine Jean Irigoin  for Histoire du texte de Pindare 1955:
 André Parrot  for  Archéologie mésopotamienne. II, Technique et Problèmes Maurice Mercier  for  Le feu grégeois 1956: Christian Courtois for Les Vandales et l'Afrique 1959:
 Georges Vallet  for Rhégion et Zancle Henri Le Bonniec  for  Le culte de Cérès à Rome 1962: Hans-Georg Pflaum  for  Les carrières procuratoriennes équestres sous le haut-empire romain 1965: François Chamoux for La Civilisation grecque à l'époque archaïque et classique 1968: Marcel Le Glay for Saturne africain, Histoire et Monuments 1971: Michel Labrousse  for Toulouse antique 1974: Goulven Madec for Saint Ambroise et la philosophie 1977: Madeleine Bonjour for Terre natale. études sur une composante affective du patriotisme romain 1980: Robert Amy and Pierre Gros for La maison Carrée de Nîmes 1983: Jean-Marie Dentzet for Le motif du banquet couché dans le Proche-Orient et le monde grec du VIIe au IVe siècle avant J.-C. 1986: Madeleine Jost for Sanctuaires et cultes d'Arcadie 1988: Marie-Ange Bonhême for Les Noms royaux dans l'Égypte de la troisième période intermédiaire 1989: André Tchernia for Le vin de l'Italie romaine : essai d'histoire économique d'après les amphores 1992: Alexandre Grandazzi  for  La fondation de Rome. Réflexion sur l’histoire 1995: René Ginouvès
 1998: François de Callataÿ for L’histoire des guerres mithridatiques vues par les monnaies 2001: Galien for Exhortation à l’étude de la médecine, Art médical II. Édition et traduction par Véronique Boudon 2004: Bernard Holzmann for L’acropole d’Athènes 2007: Christophe Feyel for Les artisans dans les sanctuaires grecs aux époques classique et hellénistique à travers la documentation financière en Grèce 2013: André Tchernia for Les Romains et le commerce 2016: Hélène Dessales for Le Partage de l’eau. Fontaines et distribution hydraulique dans l’habitat urbain de l’Italie romaine 2020: Pierre Judet de La Combe for her work dedicated to Homer and her translation in Tout Homère of the Illiad.

Middle Age and Renaissance
 1906: 
 Jules Gay for L'Italie méridionale et l'Empire byzantin depuis l'avènement de Basile Ier jusqu'à la prise de Bari par les Normands (867-1071) Charles Samaran and Guillaume Mollat for La fiscalité pontificale en France au xive siècle (période d'Avignon et grand schisme d'Occident) Pierre Champion for Guillaume de Flavy, capitaine de Compiègne 1909: 
 Albert Vogt for Basile Ier, empereur de Byzance, 867-886, and la civilisation byzantine à la fin du IXe siècle Henri Quentin, for Les martyrologes historiques du Moyen Âge Mr. Wartmann for Les vitraux suisses au musée du Louvre Paul Perdrizet for La Vierge de Miséricorde 1912:
 Ferdinand Chalandon for Jean II Comnène, 1118-1143, et Manuel I Comnène, 1143-1180 Frédégand Callaey for L'Idéalisme franciscain spirituel au XIVe siècle. Étude sur Ubertin de Casale Jean Longnon for Chronique de Morée Dom Antonio Staerk for Les manuscrits latins du Ve au XIIIe siècle conservés à la Bibliothèque impériale de Saint-Pétersbourg 1915:
 Henri Hauvette for Boccace, étude biographique et littéraire René de Brebisson for Les Rabodanges 1918:
 André Blum for L'estampe satirique en France pendant les guerres de religion Charles Guéry for Histoire de l'abbaye de Lyre Arthur Långfors for Les incipit des poèmes français antérieurs au XVIe siècle Eugène Parturier for Délie, object de plus haulte vertu, édition critique par Maurice Scève 1924: Edmond Faral for Les Arts poétiques du xiie et du xiiie siècles 1939:
 Georges Gaillard Les Débuts de la sculpture romane espagnole Louis-Fernand Flutre and K. sneyders for Li Fet des Romains : compilé ensemble de Saluste et de Suetoine et de Lucan : texte du XIIIe siècle Charles de Tolnay for Le Maître de Flémalle et les frères Van Eyck 1942:
 Suzanne Solente for Le Livre des fais et bonnes meurs du sage roy Charles V par Christine de Pisan René Vielliard for Les origines de la Rome chrétienne Pierre Daudet for L'Etablissement de la compétence de l'Eglise en matière de divorce et de consanguinité 1945 Raymonde Foreville for L'Église et la royauté en Angleterre sous Henri II Plantagenêt (1154-1189) 1990:  for Les châteaux de France au siècle de la Renaissance 1993: Bernard Vincent for 1492 - « L’année terrible » 1996: Christian Trottmann for La vision béatifique. - Des disputes scolastiques à sa définition par Benoît XII 1999:  for Agrippa d’Aubigné 2002: Florence Vuilleumier-Laurens for La raison des figures symboliques à la Renaissance et à l’Âge classique 2005: Ursula Bähler for Gaston Paris et la philologie romane 2008:  for La légende du roi Arthur 2011: Hélène Millet for L’Église du Grand Schisme (1378-1417) 2014: André Bouvard and his collaborators for Heinrich Schickhardt, Inventarium, 1630-1632. L’inventaire des biens et des œuvres d’un architecte de la Renaissance. 2017: Thomas Tanase for Marco PoloLaureates of the Académie des sciences morales et politiques
 1877 : Gabriel Compayré for Histoire critique des doctrines de l'éducation en France depuis le seizième siècle.
 1999 :  for La femme seule et le prince charmant. Enquête sur la vie en solo, Paris (Nathan), 1999 (in the category Morality and sociology).
 2001 : Cécile Janura for her doctoral thesis Le droit administratif de Marcel Waline. Essai sur la contribution d’un positiviste au droit administratif français (Université d’Artois, 1999). (in the category Legislation, public law and jurisprudence).
 2003 : Olivier Midière for his work L’aigle, le bœuf et le e-business, 3 tomes, auto-édition, 2002 (in the categories Political Economy, statistics and finance).
 2005 : Jean-Pierre Gutton for Dévots et société au XVIIe siècle. Construire le ciel sur la terre, Paris (Belin), 2004 (in the category History and Geography).
 2007 : Frédéric Gros for États de violence. Essai sur la fin de la guerre, Paris (Gallimard), 2006 (in the general category).
 2009 :  for Nicolas Beauzée, grammairien philosophe, Paris (Honoré Champion), 2009 (in the category Philosophy).
 2011 :  for Jours de fête. Jours fériés et fêtes légales dans la France contemporaine, Paris (Tallandier), 2010 (in the category Morality and sociology).
 2013 : Soudabeh Marin for Ostad Elahi et la tradition. Droit, philosophie et mystique en Iran, et Ostad Elahi et la modernité. Droit, philosophie et magistrature en Iran, éditions Safran, Bruxelles, 2012.
 2015 :  for Pourquoi pas nous ?, Paris (Fayard/Les Belles Lettres), 2014.

Laureates of the Académie des Beaux-Arts
 1883 :  for Les Médailleurs italiens des XVe et XVIe siècles.
 ...
 1989 : Pierre et François Greffe for Traité des dessins et des modèles.
 2001 : Hervé Lacombe for Georges Bizet : Naissance d'une identité créatrice, Fayard, 2000.
 2007 : Andrei Nakov for Kazimir Malewicz, le peintre absolu, Thalia Édition (Paris, 2007).
 2011 : Christophe Looten for his work Dans la tête de Richard Wagner, archéologie d'un génie'' (Éditions Fayard).

Laureates of the Académie des Sciences
 1862:
  (Photography).
 Mr. Miersch (Photography).
 1896 : Jacques Hadamard for his work in Geodesics.
 1929 : Henri Benard for his work on eddies in fluid dynamics.
 1992 : Monique Pick.

References

Académie Française awards
Awards of the French Academy of Sciences
French awards